Raphael Douady (born 15 November 1959) is a French mathematician and economist. He holds the Robert Frey Endowed Chair for Quantitative Finance at Stony Brook, New York. He is a fellow of the Centre d’Economie de la Sorbonne (Economic Centre of Sorbonne), Paris 1 Pantheon-Sorbonne University, and academic director of the Laboratory of Excellence on Financial Regulation (Labex Refi).

Early life and education
Douady is the son of mathematician Adrien Douady (1935–2006). He is an alumnus of Ecole Normale Supérieure, where he placed first in the entrance exam. He later ranked first in the Agrégation de mathématiques in 1980. He earned his PhD in the fields of Hamiltonian systems in 1982 at the Paris Diderot University (Paris 7), while still a student at ENS, under the guidance of Michael Herman.

Career
In 1983, Douady was appointed to the Centre National de la Recherche Scientifique (CNRS). He was affiliated with Ecole Polytechnique (1983–87), Ecole Normale Supérieure (1987–95), the Courant Institute at New York University (1995–97), Ecole Normale Supérieure of Cachan (1997–2001), and a former visiting professor at New York University Polytechnic Institute. In 2001, he founded Riskdata, a private software company, remaining with them until 2011 since when he has been affiliated to Paris 1 Pantheon-Sorbonne University.

In 1994, he created and animated the Bachelier Seminar of mathematical finance at Institut Henri Poincaré in Paris. He is also the co-founder, with Marco Avellaneda, of the Seminar of Mathematical Finance held at the Courant Institute of Mathematical Science, New York University. He has advised financial institutions including Société Générale, National Westminster Bank, Canadian Imperial Bank of Commerce and Citibank.

In 1999, along with Ingmar Adlerberg, a computer scientist from the French Institute for Research in Computer Science and Automation (INRIA) and the Massachusetts Institute of Technology (MIT), Douady co-founded Riskdata, a company producing risk management software that helps buy-side financial institutions leading a proactive risk management and complying with financial regulations. He continues to be involved as their research director.

In 2013, Douady was appointed as academic director of the Laboratory of Excellence on Financial Regulation (Labex refi), where his role was to supervise approximately sixty researchers on the inter-relations between financial regulations, the financial system and the real economy, and to advise governments and regulators on these issues. In 2015, he was appointed Frey Family endowed chair professor of quantitative finance at State University of New York in Stony Brook University. His role is to lead the graduate program in quantitative finance, initially created by Robert J. Frey.

Notable research
Douady worked on the Kolmogorov–Arnold–Moser (KAM) theorem on the existence of invariant tori in Hamiltonian systems. In his PhD thesis he proved the equivalence of KAM theory for Hamiltonian systems and for symplectomorphisms, opening the gate to discrete KAM theory. He contributed to the theory of outer billiards, providing a full proof of a result announced earlier by J. Moser.

Douady is the author of a seminal article in 1988 on Arnold diffusion, where he proved a long-standing conjecture of Vladimir Arnold on the existence of topologically unstable elliptic orbits of Hamiltonian systems in dimensions greater than or equal to 6.

In 1999, he established with Jean-Christophe Yoccoz a theory of automorphic measures of circle diffeomorphisms, a basis for differentiating the rotation number function.

Since 1994, Douady has conducted research in the field of mathematical finance, statistics and economics. He established a generalization of Heath–Jarrow–Morton interest rate model, where the yield curve is represented as a random field. With Monique Jeanblanc, he created a rating-based credit derivatives model that introduced the notion of "rating surface". In collaboration with Albert Shiryaev and Marc Yor he co-authored a theory of Brownian motions downfalls.

Douady has concentrated research on financial instabilities, nonlinearities and systemic risk. He developed a statistical theory, called "polymodels" to compute an anticyclical risk indicator, the "Stress VaR", a more extended version of the Basel III stress tests. In a book co-authored with Thomas Barrau, he demonstrated that polymodels are applicable to a wide range of problems in finance, especially the question of predicting the stock market. Inspired by Minsky's financial instability hypothesis, he proposed a Market Instability Indicator based on the first Lyapunov exponent of flows of funds evolution. In collaboration with Nassim Nicholas Taleb he developed the mathematical foundations of "fragility/antifragility" theory.

Awards
 Bronze (1976) and Gold (1977) medallist at the International Mathematical Olympiads.

References

1959 births
Living people
International Mathematical Olympiad participants
École Normale Supérieure alumni
Courant Institute of Mathematical Sciences faculty